Funny farm may refer to:
 Funny farm, a pejorative slang term for a psychiatric hospital
 The Funny Farm (film), a 1982 film starring Peter Aykroyd
 Funny Farm (film), a 1988 film starring Chevy Chase
 Funny Farm (TV series), a Canadian musical comedy television series from 1974 to 1975
 Funny Farm (Milwaukee TV show) a Milwaukee children's show
 Funny Farm (play), a 1975 television play by Roy Minton
 Funny Farm, an album by King Kong
 Funny Farm, an album by Pip Skid
 Funny Farm (novel), a novel by Jay Cronley
 Funny Farm (webcomic), a webcomic